St. Joseph's House for Homeless Industrious Boys is a historic charity building at 1511 and 1515-1527 West Allegheny Avenue in the Nicetown-Tioga neighborhood of Philadelphia, Pennsylvania.

It was designed by the Philadelphia architectural firm of Hoffman-Henon and built in 1929. It was added to the National Register in 1996.

References

Buildings and structures on the National Register of Historic Places in Philadelphia
Italianate architecture in Pennsylvania
Residential buildings completed in 1929
Nicetown-Tioga, Philadelphia